The Very Best of Mick Jagger is a compilation album that was released worldwide on 1 October 2007 and the following day in the United States on WEA/Rhino Records. This 17-track release is the first ever overview of Mick Jagger's solo career.

The collection includes singles, album tracks, and collaborations with John Lennon, David Bowie, Bono, Lenny Kravitz, Peter Tosh, Ry Cooder, David A. Stewart and Jeff Beck among others. It includes three previously unreleased songs:

"Too Many Cooks", produced by John Lennon and recorded by Jagger in 1973 in Los Angeles. The track features guitarists Danny Kortchmar and Jesse Ed Davis, keyboardist Al Kooper, bassist Jack Bruce, drummer Jim Keltner and, on backing vocals, singer-songwriter Harry Nilsson. Neither Lennon nor Bill Wyman, who was present at the session, appear on the track.
"Checking Up on My Baby", recorded in 1992 with L.A. blues band, The Red Devils.
"Charmed Life", recorded while Jagger was working on Wandering Spirit with producer Rick Rubin. Jagger had sketched it out (with his daughter Karis Jagger on backing vocals), but then decided the track didn't fit with the rest of the album. The version on Very Best is remixed by producer Ashley Beadle. The song was also released as a promo single with various remixes, and reached the Top 20 on Billboard's Hot Dance Singles chart in early 2008.

A special edition with DVD was also released with more than 72 minutes of content, including an extensive interview with Mick Jagger from early/mid-2007, nine videos, and extras.

Jagger has promoted the album through interviews including a special for Rolling Stone, a comprehensive Q&A with fans on the BBC web site and TV appearances. He also re-launched his web site with audio, video, photos and more information about this compilation and his solo work in general.

The album debuted in the British chart at No. 57 with sales of nearly 4,000 copies and in the American chart at No. 77 selling 11,846 copies during the first week.

Track listing

DVD track listing

Charts

References

Notes

Albums produced by Alan Winstanley
Albums produced by Clive Langer
Albums produced by Jack Nitzsche
Albums produced by Lenny Kravitz
Albums produced by Marti Frederiksen
Albums produced by Mick Jagger
Mick Jagger albums
Rhino Records compilation albums
2007 greatest hits albums
2007 video albums
Music video compilation albums